

Season summary
After several seasons in midtable, Die Löwen's 10-season stay in Germany's top flight ended with a 17th-place finish and relegation. Manager Falko Götz had been sacked in April, with former 1860 player Gerald Vanenburg juggling his duties as manager of PSV's youth team to replace him, but he was unable to save the club from the drop. After relegation, Rudolf Bommer, who had led fellow Bavarian club SV Wacker Burghausen to promotion to the 2. Bundesliga and consecutive 10th-place finishes in that division, was tasked with obtaining promotion.

Kit
The club's kits were manufactured by Nike and sponsored by German motor oil company Liqui Moly.

Players

First team squad
Squad at end of season

Left club during season

Competitions

Legend

Bundesliga

League table

References

Notes

TSV 1860 Munich seasons
TSV 1860 Munchen